The William Barton House, at 295 N. 300 East in Beaver, Utah, is a historic house built in 1876.  It was listed on the National Register of Historic Places in 1982.

It was built as a log house in 1876 and expanded in about 1900.  The log portion with its notching is visible on the west side of the house.  The house is upon a rubble rock foundation.

References

Log houses
Houses on the National Register of Historic Places in Utah
Houses completed in 1876
Beaver County, Utah